Agim Sali Zeka (born 6 September 1998) is an Albanian professional footballer who plays as a right winger for Kosovan club Drita.

Club career

Early career and Skënderbeu Korçë
Zeka at the age of six started playing football in Prishtina, where he has played in all age groups. In January 2015, due to ignorance by the Prishtina's staff, Zeka was loaned to the youth team of KEK, where after the end of the loan, he returned to Prishtina until January 2016, where he joined the U19 team of the Albanian club Skënderbeu Korçë. On 21 February 2016, Zeka made his debut with Skënderbeu Korçë U19 in a league match against Besa Kavajë U19 after coming on as a substitute at 42nd minute in place of Andis Foto and scored his side's second goal during a 9–0 home win.

Promotion to the first team
In 2016–17 season, Zeka is promoted to the first team of Skënderbeu Korçë, which competed in the Kategoria Superiore, which is the top tier of football in the country. On 28 September 2016, he made his debut with Skënderbeu Korçë in the 2016–17 Albanian Cup first round against Butrinti after being named in the starting line-up.

Lille B
On 31 January 2017, Zeka signed a four-and-a-half-year contract with Championnat de France Amateur club Lille B. Lille B reportedly paid a €300K transfer fee to Skënderbeu Korçë and also the later kept 20% of his card. Four days later, he made his debut in a 0–1 home defeat against L'Entente after being named in the starting line-up.

Loan to Varzim
On 9 January 2018, Zeka joined LigaPro side Varzim, on a season-long loan. Five days later, he made his debut in a 2–1 away defeat against Vitória Guimarães B after coming on as a substitute at 83rd minute in place of Mário Sérgio. One month after debut, Zeka scored his first goal for Varzim in his second appearance for the club in a 2–3 away win over Penafiel in LigaPro.

Loan to Leixões
On 8 August 2018, Zeka joined LigaPro side Leixões, on a season-long loan. Three days later, he made his debut in a 2–1 away defeat against Benfica B after coming on as a substitute at 73rd minute in place of Erivaldo.

Loan to Fortuna Sittard
On 28 January 2019, Zeka joined Eredivisie side Fortuna Sittard, on a season-long loan. Fourteen days later, he made his debut, but with U21 team in a 0–2 home defeat against PEC Zwolle U21 after being named in the starting line-up. On 12 May 2019, he made his first team debut in a 3–0 away defeat against Groningen after coming on as a substitute at 76th minute in place of Mark Diemers.

Mouscron
On 1 August 2020, Lille B announced the transfer of Zeka to Belgian side Mouscron. In same day later, the club confirmed that he had joined on a one year contract. He was named as a Mouscron substitute, twice in August for league games against Antwerp (seven days after joining), and Mechelen (six days later), but was an unused substitute in these matches which were the last he was called up by the team.

Austria Wien
On 20 January 2021, Zeka joined Austrian Bundesliga side Austria Wien and received squad number 23. Seventeen days later, he made his debut with Austria Wien in the 2020–21 Austrian Cup quarter-finals against Red Bull Salzburg after coming on as a substitute at 86th minute in place of Stephan Zwierschitz. Zeka made his first Austrian Bundesliga appearance four days later after coming on as a substitute at 82nd minute in place of Andreas Poulsen in a 3–1 away defeat again against Red Bull Salzburg.

Drita
On 1 August 2021, Zeka signed a two-year contract with Football Superleague of Kosovo club Drita.

International career

Under-17
On 6 October 2014, Zeka was named as part of the Albania U17 squad for 2015 UEFA European Under-17 Championship qualifications. Two days later, he made his debut with Albania U17 in a match against Norway U17 after being named in the starting line-up. Five days after debut, Zeka scored his first goal for Albania U17 in his third appearance for the country in a 5–1 home win over San Marino U17.

Under-19
On 30 September 2016, Zeka was named as part of the Albania U19 squad for 2017 UEFA European Under-19 Championship qualifications. Six days later, he made his debut with Albania U19 in a match against Republic of Ireland U19 after being named in the starting line-up. Two days after debut, Zeka scored his first goals for Albania U19 in his second appearance for the country in a 2–3 home defeat over Germany U19, he had the same fate three days later when scored a goal in a 1–0 home minimal win over Gibraltar U19.

Under-21 and Under-20
On 2 June 2017, Zeka received an urgent call-up from Albania U21 for the friendly match against France U21 and 2019 UEFA European Under-21 Championship qualification opening match against Estonia U21 to replace one of the three injured players. Three days later, he made his debut with Albania U21 in friendly match against France U21 after coming on as a substitute at 52nd minute in place of Elvir Maloku. Five month later, Zeka received a call-up from Albania U20 for the friendly match against Georgia U20, and made his debut after being named in the starting line-up.

Career statistics

Club

References

External links

1998 births
Living people
Sportspeople from Pristina
Albanian footballers
Albania youth international footballers
Albania under-21 international footballers
Albanian expatriate footballers
Albanian expatriate sportspeople in France
Albanian expatriate sportspeople in Portugal
Albanian expatriate sportspeople in the Netherlands
Albanian expatriate sportspeople in Belgium
Albanian expatriate sportspeople in Austria
Kosovan footballers
Kosovan expatriate footballers
Kosovan expatriate sportspeople in France
Kosovan expatriate sportspeople in the Netherlands
Kosovan expatriate sportspeople in Belgium
Kosovan expatriate sportspeople in Austria
Association football wingers
Kategoria Superiore players
KF Skënderbeu Korçë players
Championnat National 2 players
Lille OSC players
Liga Portugal 2 players
Varzim S.C. players
Leixões S.C. players
Eredivisie players
Fortuna Sittard players
Belgian Pro League players
Royal Excel Mouscron players
Austrian Football Bundesliga players
FK Austria Wien players
Football Superleague of Kosovo players
FC Drita players